Wizards Presents: Races and Classes is an accessory released as a preview for the 4th edition of the Dungeons & Dragons fantasy role-playing game, published in December 2007.

Contents
With Wizards Presents: Races and Classes, Wizards of the Coast presented its first preview of the 4th edition of Dungeons & Dragons. Written by the new edition's designers, Races and Classes explores the concepts and decisions that went into creating the new version, in terms of mechanics, art and ideas. Included with this book is the 4th edition design timeline, various excerpts from emails, and numerous anecdotes.

Publication history
Wizards Presents: Races and Classes was published by Wizards of the Coast, compiled and Edited by Michele Carter, and written by Richard Baker, Logan Bonner, Bruce R. Cordell, Rob Heinsoo, Gwendolyn Kestrel, Mike Mearls, David Noonan, Stephen Radney-MacFarland, Stephen Schubert, Chris Sims, Matthew Sernett, Rodney Thompson, and James Wyatt with Bill Slavicsek, Stacy Longstreet, William O'Connor, Andy Collins, Christopher Perkins, and Daniel Reeve. Cover art is by William O'Connor, and the book is illustrated by Eric Deschamps, Wayne England, David Griffith, Ralph Horsley, Todd Lockwood, Stacy Longstreet, Howard Lyon, Lee Moyer, William O'Connor, Steve Prescott, Daniel Reeve, and Arnie Swekel.

Shannon Appelcline commented that because Dungeons & Dragons Fourth Edition was published in the 21st century, more is known about that edition of the game  than about almost any other roleplaying game, and "A lot of that is thanks to a pair of books published by Wizards, Wizards Presents: Races and Classes (2007) and Wizards Presents: Worlds and Monsters (2007). These discussions of 4e's design helped to build interest in the upcoming release and they also contributed to Wizard's final year of third-edition publication, when they were loathe to publish any actual game books. However, interviews, blogs, journals, tweets, forum posts and just about every other sort of high-tech information dispersal available to the modern world have supplemented those books."

Reception
Wizards Presents: Races and Classes was reviewed by the online version of Pyramid on February 22, 2008. The reviewer declared that for some people, this book "will be the most important book of 2007" as the first preview of the forthcoming 4th edition. The reviewer identified some of its apparent sources of inspiration, which includes other Wizards of the Coast supplements, such as the recent Saga Edition of the Star Wars Roleplaying Game, Complete Arcane, Miniatures Handbook, and Tome of Battle.

References

Dungeons & Dragons sourcebooks
Role-playing game supplements introduced in 2007